David Graham (June 1875 – January 1962, in Carlisle) was an English rugby football player, from Aspatria, in Cumberland.

He played for Aspatria RUFC, Keswick RFC, Rochdale, New Brighton and Cumberland, as well as Aspatria Hornets rugby league team.

References
 Goodwin, Terry The Complete Who's Who of International Rugby (Blandford Press, England, 1987)

1875 births
1962 deaths
England international rugby union players
English rugby league players
English rugby union players
New Brighton F.C. players
Rugby league players from Aspatria
Rugby union players from Aspatria